Xperience was a live professional wrestling event held by the World Wrestling Federation (WWF), which took place on August 24, 1996 from the Exhibition Stadium in Toronto, Ontario. It was considered to be the tenth anniversary of The Big Event which took place ten years earlier in the same venue.

Event
During the opening match, The Godwinns (Henry O. Godwinn and Phineas I. Godwinn) (with Hillbilly Jim) defeated The New Rockers (Marty Jannetty and Leif Cassidy), following Phineas pinning Cassidy.

The following match saw Hunter Hearst Helmsley defeat Bob Holly via pinfall. The next match was a Caribbean Strap match in which Savio Vega defeated Justin Bradshaw. This was followed by Jose Lothario defeating Jim Cornette.

During the next match between Stone Cold Steve Austin and Marc Mero, Mankind came to the ring and attempted to kidnap Sable. Mero was distracted by this and went after Mankind, resulting in Mero being counted out.

The following match was a lumberjack match, with the Toronto Argonauts serving as the lumberjacks. During this match, Sycho Sid defeated Vader following a chokeslam.

The next match saw Faarooq make quick work of Aldo Montoya for the victory.

During the WWF Tag Team Championship, the champions, The Smoking Gunns (Billy Gunn and Bart Gunn) retained their titles against Owen Hart and The British Bulldog. After The British Bulldog hit a running powerslam and went for the cover, Sunny pulled the referee out of the ring, forcing the referee to disqualify the Gunns.

The second to last match, was a casket match between The Undertaker and Mankind. After Undertaker hit Mankind with a chokeslam followed by a tombstone, Undertaker rolled Mankind into the casket for the victory,

The main event saw Shawn Michaels defend the WWF World Heavyweight Championship against Goldust in a Ladder match. After Michaels hit Goldust with the Sweet Chin Music, he was able to successfully climb the ladder to retain the title.

Results

See also

1996 in professional wrestling
Professional wrestling in Canada

References

Professional wrestling in Toronto
1996 in Toronto
August 1996 events in Canada
Events in Toronto
1996 in professional wrestling
WWE shows
WWE in Canada